Chionea is a genus of wingless limoniid crane flies. It consists of two subgenera, the holarctic Chionea and palaearctic Sphaeconophilus. About 40 species are currently recognized in the northern hemisphere, but there are probably several undescribed species. They are commonly called snow flies.

Description
Adults occur during winter, where they can be observed walking over snow. They produce glycerol in their hemolymph, preventing them from freezing.

Up to 200 eggs have been found in female snow flies, which are laid singly. The larvae occur under decaying leaves in wooded regions (Marchand, 1917). At least the larvae of some species seem to feed on feces in rodent burrows.

Adults seem to actively seek out the coldest place they can find and drink water by pressing their proboscis against the snow (Marchand, 1917), but are not known to feed. Adult snow flies live for up to two months. They can walk at a speed of about 1.30 m per minute, and at least males have been observed to leap, without being provoked.

Male C. alexandriana are about seven millimeters long.

They are easiest found on snowbanks in the afternoon, in areas that are to some extent forested. Some species have been found to be abundant on the floor of caves.

The winglessness of the genus is probably attributable to the fact that at sub-freezing temperatures, it is very hard to generate enough energy for maintaining flight muscles. Also, the space normally taken by flight muscles is used to store eggs. However, the halteres have not been reduced and are innervated, thus probably serving as sensory organs.

Cold tolerance
As some species of Chionea are adapted to living on snow and in subnivean habitats, they are considered cold tolerant insects. It has been frequently reported that Chionea are observed at temperatures between 0 and -6 °C. In an experiment conducted in a laboratory environment, Chionea araneoides specimens died at a mean temperature of -7.5 °C, their supercooling point; another experiment on an undetermined species of European Chionea demonstrated a supercooling point of -11.2 °C. The antifreeze agent found in Chionea hemolymph has been determined to be sugar trehalose.

Reproduction
Mating is indiscriminate (probably because it is very hard to find a specimen of the other sex for them) and takes 30 to 70 minutes. Winged Crane flies and wingless snow crane flies mate tail to tail and this has been verified with video evidence by Vanessa Logsdon et al.

Predators
One of the reasons why adults emerge in winter seems to be the absence of predators. However, "rock crickets" (Grylloblattidae) have been shown to feed on them.
Because the cysticercoid form of a tapeworm species has been found in two out of three C. stoneana specimens in eastern Kansas, they also have to be eaten by mice, which are the tapeworm's host. The snow fly larvae likely take up these tapeworms via mouse feces.

Parasites

Tapeworm cysticercoids, possibly of the genus Hymenolepis, have been found in the abdomens of Chionea stoneana.

While most likely not a parasite of snow flies, a species of nematode, similar to Rhabditis, can sometimes be found in a ringed capsule, which is called a dauer, around the neck of adult snow flies. Immature nematodes develop inside the dauer before ultimately dispersing from it. It has been speculated that the female nematode lays this ring around the fly's neck when it emerges from the pupa and cannot yet move properly. These nematodes are presumed to be phoretic, meaning that they use the snow fly as a mechanism for dispersal, and not snow fly parasites.

Species

Subgenus Chionea (Holarctic)
 Chionea albertensis Alexander, 1941 (Canada, United States south to Oregon, Idaho)
 Chionea alexandriana Garrett, 1922 (Canada, USA to California, Utah)
 Chionea araneoides Dalman, 1816 (Europe: Sweden to Italy, Romania and Russia)
 Chionea carolus Byers, 1979 (USA: California, Nevada)
 Chionea crassipes Boheman, 1846
 Chionea crassipes crassipes (Scandinavia, Russia to Japan)
 Chionea crassipes magadanensis Narchuk, 1998 (Russia: Magadan Oblast)
 Chionea durbini Byers, 1983 (USA: California)
 Chionea excavata Byers, 1983 (USA: California, Nevada)
 Chionea hybrida Byers, 1983 (USA: Idaho, Utah)
 Chionea jellisoni Byers, 1983 (USA: Montana, Idaho, Utah)
 Chionea jenniferae (Byers, 1995) (USA: California)
 Chionea kanenoi Sasakawa, 1986 (Japan: Honshū)
 Chionea lyrata Byers, 1983 (USA: California)
 Chionea macnabeana Alexander, 1947 (Canada, USA to Washington, Oregon)
 Chionea mirabilis Vanin, 2008 (Korea)
 Chionea nigra Byers, 1983 (USA: Utah, Colorado)
 Chionea nipponica Alexander, 1932 (Russia:Primorsky Krai, Japan)
 Chionea nivicola Doane, 1900 (USA: Washington, Oregon, Idaho, Montana)
 Chionea obtusa Byers, 1983 (Canada, USA to Oregon, Idaho)
 Chionea pusilla Savchenko, 1983 (Russia: Primorsky Krai)
 Chionea racovitzai Burghele-Balacesco, 1969 (Romania)
 Chionea reclusa Byers, 1995 (USA: Illinois)
 Chionea scita Walker, 1848 (Canada, USA to Kentucky, Tennessee and Georgia)
 Chionea stoneana Alexander, 1940 (USA: Minnesota to Indiana, south to Kansas, Oklahoma and Missouri)
 Chionea valga Harris, 1841 (Canada, USA south to Minnesota, Wisconsin, Tennessee, North Carolina and Virginia)
 Chionea wilsoni Byers, 1983 (USA: Alabama, Tennessee, North Carolina)

Subgenus Sphaeconophilus (Palaearctic)
 Chionea alpina Bezzi, 1908 (Europe: France to Spain, Germany to Montenegro)
 Chionea ancae (Menier and Matile, 1976) (France)
 Chionea arverna (Brunhes, 1986) (France: Massif Central)
 Chionea austriaca (Christian, 1980) (Austria)
 Chionea belgica (Becker, 1912) (Europe: Belgium, Denmark, Germany, Hungary, Netherlands, Switzerland)
 Chionea besucheti (Bourne, 1979) (Switzerland)
 Chionea botosaneanui (Burghele-Balacesco, 1969) (Czech Republic, Poland, Romania, Slovakia)
 Chionea catalonica (Bourne, 1979) (Spain: central Pyrenees)
 Chionea jurassica (Bourne, 1979) (France)
 Chionea lutescens 
 Chionea lutescens lutescens Lundstrom, 1907 (Europe: Sweden to Portugal, Ukraine, Russia)
 Chionea lutescens stelviana Suss, 1982 (Italy: Lombardia)
 Chionea pyrenaea (Bourne, 1981) (France: Pyrenees)

See also
 Snow scorpionflies

References

 Marchand, W. (1917). Notes on the habits of the snow-fly (Chionea). Psyche 24:142-152. PDF (Creative Commons Attribution 2.5 license)
 Byers, G.W. (1983). The crane fly genus Chionea in North America. Univ. of Kansas Science Bulletin 52(6):59-195.
 Schrock, J.R. (1992). Snow Flies. The Kansas School Naturalist 38(2). HTML - Anatomical drawings of C. alexandriana

External links
 Picture of a Chionea species

Limoniidae
Nematocera genera
Taxa named by Johan Wilhelm Dalman